The Central West Virginia Transportation Authority, known by the moniker of Centra Bus, is a public transportation service located in Harrison County, West Virginia. It provides rural and inter-city bus and paratransit service to select communities within the county.

Route list
Adamson
Anmoore
Bridgeport
Despard
Hartland
Nutter Fort
Shinnson
Stealy
UHC/Charles Pointe
West Milford
Wolf Summit/Salem

References

Bus transportation in West Virginia
Transportation in Harrison County, West Virginia
Transit agencies in West Virginia